The Province of Jülich-Cleves-Berg was a province of Prussia from 1815 to 1822. Jülich-Cleves-Berg was established in 1815 from part restored and part newly annexed lands by the Kingdom of Prussia from France's Grand Duchy of Berg. Jülich-Cleves-Berg was dissolved in 1822 when it was merged with the Grand Duchy of the Lower Rhine to form Rhine Province. Cologne was the provincial capital.

History 
After the Napoleonic Wars, the Congress of Vienna restored the Duchy of Cleves to the Kingdom of Prussia, which combined them with the other Rhenish lands restored from France (Prussian Guelders and the Principality of Moers) with the Rhenish lands gained at Vienna — the old Duchy of Jülich and County of Berg along with parts of the Electorate of Cologne and the Free and Hanseatic City of Cologne and some other smaller territories.

The province's name was a reference to the United Duchies of Jülich-Cleves-Berg, a former territory of the Holy Roman Empire which contained most of the land.

The provincial government was headquartered in Cologne, with the province subdivided into Regierungsbezirke (districts) of Düsseldorf, Cleves and Cologne from 22 April 1816. The provincial president was Frederick, Count of Solms-Laubach.

On 22 June 1822, an order of the Prussian cabinet united the province with the Grand Duchy of the Lower Rhine province, with its capital in Koblenz, to form the Rhine Province.

See also 
 United Duchies of Jülich-Cleves-Berg

Provinces of Prussia
Former states and territories of North Rhine-Westphalia
History of the Rhineland
1815 establishments in Prussia
1822 disestablishments in Prussia